John McMahon (born 18 May 1932) is an Australian cricketer. He played in two first-class matches for Queensland in 1959/60.

See also
 List of Queensland first-class cricketers

References

External links
 

1932 births
Living people
Australian cricketers
Queensland cricketers
Cricketers from Sydney